Teddy Trabichet (born March 10, 1987) is  an ice hockey defenceman who plays for Brûleurs de Loups of the Ligue Magnus.

Trabichet has played for the France national team at the 2008, 2011 2015 and 2016 World Ice Hockey Championships.

References

External links

1987 births
Living people
Brûleurs de Loups players
Diables Rouges de Briançon players
French ice hockey defencemen
Gothiques d'Amiens players
People from Échirolles
Rapaces de Gap players
Sportspeople from Isère